Cor Jesu may refer to:
 Cor Jesu College
 Cor Jesu Academy
 Sacred Heart of Jesus